Baviera is a Spanish-language surname. It is also the name for the German state of Bavaria in Spanish.

Notable people with the surname include:

Aileen Baviera (1959-2020), a Filipino academic
José Baviera (1906–1981), a Spanish film actor
Vincenzo Baviera (born 1945), a Swiss sculptor

See also
Julio Cervera Baviera (1854–1927), a Spanish engineer
Villa Baviera, a former internment camp in Chile

Spanish-language surnames